Abney-Hastings is a double-barrelled surname created from the surnames Abney and Hastings.

The family is most notable for their royal heritage as the senior descendants of George Plantagenet, 1st Duke of Clarence, as explained in the BBC historical documentary, Britain's Real Monarch, presented by Tony Robinson. And historic tradition of reference for their family seat, Loudoun Castle, a 19th-century country house near Galston, in the Loudoun area of Ayrshire, Scotland. Which was referred to as, The Windsor of Scotland.

Notable people with this surname include:

Barbara Abney-Hastings, 13th Countess of Loudoun (1919–2002), British aristocrat
Charles Abney Hastings (1792–1858), of Willesley Hall, Derbyshire
Edith Abney-Hastings, 12th Countess of Loudoun (1883–1960), English aristocrat
Frank Abney Hastings (1794–1828), British naval officer
Michael Abney-Hastings, 14th Earl of Loudoun (1942–2012), British-born Australian rice researcher, also known as King Michael
Simon Abney-Hastings, 15th Earl of Loudoun (born 1974), Australian peer, head of the House of York, also known as King Simon

See also
Abney-Hastings baronets

References

Compound surnames